Ayhan Karakuş (born 13 October 1989) is a Turkish wrestler competing in the 55 kg division of Greco-Roman style. The  athlete is a member of Kasımpaşaspor Club in Istanbul, where he is coached by İbrahim Yıldırım.

His twin brother Erhan Karakuş is also a national wrestler in Greco-Roman style with international success.

Ayhan Karakuş qualified for the 2012 Summer Olympics and finished in 16th place.

He won one of the bronze medals in the men's Greco-Roman 60 kg event at the 2021 Islamic Solidarity Games held in Konya, Turkey.

Achievements

References

External links
 

1989 births
Living people
Turkish male sport wrestlers
People from Sivas
Olympic wrestlers of Turkey
Wrestlers at the 2012 Summer Olympics
Islamic Solidarity Games medalists in wrestling
Islamic Solidarity Games competitors for Turkey
20th-century Turkish people
21st-century Turkish people